Wangguanrentun railway station  is a station of Jingbao Railway in Datong City, Shanxi.

See also
List of stations on Jingbao railway

Railway stations in Shanxi